

Primary broadcast team 
For most Giants radio broadcasts on KNBR, Jon Miller and Dave Flemming take turns calling play-by-play (usually Miller will call innings 1-2, 5-6, 8-9, and Flemming will call innings 3-4, and 7). The Giants' telecasts on NBC Sports Bay Area and KNTV feature Duane Kuiper as play-by-play announcer with Mike Krukow as color analyst.

Through 2010, Miller held a second job as play-by-play announcer for ESPN Sunday Night Baseball, and therefore usually missed weekend Giants games. On these occasions, Greg Papa would take Miller's place on either the television or radio side; however, on weekends when the Giants were featured on Fox television (Saturday) or ESPN (Sunday) and therefore not on local TV, Kuiper and Krukow would join Flemming on the radio, and Miller would generally work the Saturday game if ESPN was in San Francisco that weekend. Since leaving ESPN, Miller also calls select games on NBC Sports Bay Area.

On July 14, 2006, for a Friday night home game, Flemming made his television broadcast debut for the Giants.  Since then, Flemming and Kuiper have taken turns calling games on the radio and on NBC Sports Bay Area (Flemming calling innings 1-3, 7-9, and Kuiper calling innings 4-6 on the radio; and vice versa on TV) whenever Miller is off. Similarly, Miller and Kuiper also take turns on KNBR and NBC Sports Bay Area (Miller calling innings 1-3, 7-9, and Kuiper calling innings 4-6 on the radio; and vice versa on TV) when Flemming is off.

After every game all of the announcers come together on the radio side for the "post game wrap", recapping the game's key plays and selecting players-of-the-game in humorous fashion.

Additional broadcasters
F.P. Santangelo, formerly with the Washington Nationals, assisted Flemming on some broadcasts, and retired broadcaster Lon Simmons (died 2015) was usually present several times a season. Since May 2007, and only during weekend home games and road games against the A's, retired Giants first baseman J.T. Snow has performed color analyst duties alongside Flemming. In the 2010 season, Doug Greenwald (son of former Giants broadcaster Hank Greenwald and regular announcer for the AAA (Fresno Grizzlies) called several Giants radio broadcasts as a substitute for Flemming. Former Giants reliever Jeremy Affeldt joined Kuiper for a radio broadcast on September 15, 2016.

Joe Ritzo and Randy Winn are currently the fill-ins on KNBR when Kuiper, Miller, and/or Flemming are off/on TV. Shawn Estes, Javier Lopez, and Hunter Pence fill in for Mike Krukow when he is off.

Spanish-language radio broadcasts are handled by Erwin Higueros, who calls the play-by-play, and Tito Fuentes, who performs color analyst duties. Marvin Benard also serves as a color analyst for road games.

Past broadcasters 
Over the years, the Giants have employed numerous other on-air broadcasters, including Hall of Famers Russ Hodges and Lon Simmons, as well as Al Michaels, Hank Greenwald, Ron Fairly, Lindsey Nelson, Ted Robinson, and Joe Angel, among others in English, and Amaury Pi-Gonzalez, in Spanish.

List of broadcasters

New York

Television
Frank Frisch: 1947
Steve Ellis: 1947–1948
Russ Hodges: 1949–1957
Al Helfer: 1949
Ernie Harwell: 1950–1953
Bob DeLaney: 1954–1957
Jim Woods: 1957

Radio
Arch McDonald: 1939
Garnett Marks: 1939
Mel Allen: 1939–1940, 1942
Joe Bolton: 1940
Connie Desmond: 1942
Bill Slater: 1944–1945
Don Dunphy: 1944
Al Helfer: 1945, 1949
Jack Brickhouse: 1946
Steve Ellis: 1946–1947
Frank Frisch: 1947–1948
Maury Farrell: 1948
Russ Hodges: 1949–1957
Ernie Harwell: 1950–1953
Bob DeLaney: 1954–1957
Jim Woods: 1957

San Francisco

Television
Russ Hodges: 1958–1971
Lon Simmons: 1958–1973, 1977–1978, 1996–2002
Bill Thompson: 1966–1973
Al Michaels: 1974–1976
Gary Park: 1974–1987
Lindsey Nelson: 1979–1981
Edgard Martinez: 1981
Hank Greenwald: 1982–1986, 1989–1992
Phil Stone: 1986
Joe Morgan: 1986–1993
Ron Fairly: 1987, 1990–1992
Duane Kuiper: 1985–1992, 1994–present
Steve Physioc: 1988-1989
Ted Robinson: 1993–2001
Mike Krukow: 1993–present
Jon Miller: 1997–present
Joe Angel: 2002–2003
Tim McCarver: 2002
Greg Papa: 2004–2006
Dave Flemming: 2006–present
Jeremy Affeldt: 2017
Javier López: 2017–present
Shawn Estes: 2019-present
Hunter Pence: 2021-present

Radio
Russ Hodges: 1958–1971
Lon Simmons: 1958–1973, 1976–1978, 1997–2002
Bill King: 1958–1962
Bill Thompson: 1965–1973
Bill Rigney: 1969
Al Michaels: 1974–1976
Art Eckman: 1974–1975
Joe Angel: 1977–1978, 2002–2003
Lindsey Nelson: 1979–1981
Hank Greenwald: 1979–1986, 1989–1996
Dennis Higgins 2000
David Glass: 1981–1985
Phil Stone: 1986
Ron Fairly: 1987–1992
Wayne Hagin: 1987–1988
Duane Kuiper: 1992, 1996–present
Joe Morgan: 1992
Ted Robinson: 1993–2001
Barry Tompkins: 1993
Mike Krukow: 1994–2003, 2006–present
Jon Miller: 1997–present
Dave Flemming: (2003 substitute only) 2004–present
Greg Papa: 2004–2009
Joe Ritzo: 2021-present (substitute only)

Spanish radio
Enrique Bolanos: 1982
Carlos Rivera: 1982, 1992
Tito Fuentes: 1982-1991, 2005–present
Ramón Rodriguez: 1983
Armando Provedor: 1984-1985
Edgard Martinez:1981–1986, 1988, 1994
Julio González: 1989–1990, 1993–1997
Eduardo Ortega: 1991
Rene De La Rosa: 1993–1999
Amaury Pi-Gonzalez: 1996–2006
Erwin Higueros: 1998–present
Marvin Benard: 2016–present

List of broadcast outlets

New York

Television
WNBT: 1947-1948
WPIX: 1949-1957

Radio
WABC: 1939-1941
WOR: 1942-1943
WINS: 1944-1945
WMCA: 1946-1957

San Francisco

Television
KTVU: 1961–2007
GiantsVision: 1986–1989
SportsChannel Pacific: 1990–1997
Fox Sports Bay Area: 1998–2007
Comcast SportsNet Bay Area: 2008–2016
NBC Sports Bay Area: 2017–present
KNTV: 2008–present

Radio
KSFO: 1958-1978
KNBR: 1979–present
KNBR-FM: 2019-present (Simulcast of KNBR AM)

Spanish radio
KOFY: 1981–1985
KIQI: 1986–1988, 2009–2011
KLOK: 1989–1991, 2005–2008
KZSF: 1999
KTRB: 2012–2016
KKSF: 2016
KXZM: 2017–present

See also
List of current Major League Baseball announcers

References

External links
List of Giants radio broadcasters

 Broadcasters
San Francisco Giants
SportsChannel
Fox Sports Networks
NBC Sports Regional Networks
Major League Baseball on NBC
Broadcasters